Ryszard Żugaj (born 12 July 1957) is a Polish former backstroke swimmer. He competed in two events at the 1976 Summer Olympics.

References

External links
 

1957 births
Living people
Polish male backstroke swimmers
Olympic swimmers of Poland
Swimmers at the 1976 Summer Olympics
People from Krotoszyn
Sportspeople from Greater Poland Voivodeship
20th-century Polish people